Bogdan Popović (Serbian Cyrillic: Богдан Поповић; 20 December 1863 – 7 November 1944) was one of the most important literary critics and university professors in Serbia and later Yugoslavia and an academic. He was the brother of Pavle Popović, also a literary critic and professor and one of the most influential critics.

Biography
Bogdan Popović, a Serbian writer, aesthetic and literary theorist, university professor, member of the Serbian Royal Academy, one of the founders of the Serbian Literary Herald and the creator of the 'Belgrade literary style,' was born in Belgrade on 20 December 1863. His work signalled the city's leadership of Serbian cultural aspirations.

Popović studied literature and philosophy at both Belgrade's Grandes écoles and at the University of Paris. Returning home in 1893, he became a professor at his alma mater, and twelve years later when the Grandes écoles became accredited as the University of Belgrade he continued teaching French, comparative literature, literary theory and aesthetics until his retirement in 1934. Pavle Popović, his brother, was also a professor of Serbian Literature at the University of Belgrade.

Bogdan Popović published his Anthology of Modern Serbian Lyric (Antologija novije srpske lirike) in 1911, the first attempt to create a literary canon of the most significant poems down the ages. He chose examples that reveal a constant and highly developed poetic expression as the hallmark of Serbian literary achievement. He was the first to distance poetry from folk heritage, proposing an alternative view of sophisticated forms with a broad poetic range and insight into the kind of understanding art offers.

Popović founded the Serbian Literary Herald (Srpski književni glasnik) in 1901, the most prestigious literary magazine in Serbia. Jovan Skerlić who died suddenly on the eve of World War I, was one of Popović best pupils at the Grandes écoles, and later, one of his closest collaborators and colleagues. Following his mentor's footsteps, Skerlić first taught French at the institution where he had been educated before becoming Professor of Serbian Literature when the university was established (1905). Skerlić then went on to join Popović's editorial board of the Serbian Literary Herald, becoming chief editor for a time. The Serbian Literary Herald, however, ceased publication for the duration of World War I, but continued after the liberation of Belgrade until the Nazi invasion of the Kingdom of Yugoslavia in 1941. All important Serbian writers published their work in its pages, while the magazine also included reviews, criticism and general articles on film, foreign literature, feminism and women's writing.

As a result of Popović's hard work at the university and the literary journal, he was admitted to the Serbian Royal Academy of Arts (now known as the Serbian Academy of Sciences and Arts) on 3 February 1914.

Popović was one of the founders of the Serbian PEN Club (a branch of International PEN, and The Society of Modern Languages and Literature. He was also an art critic and a musician.

Bogdan Popović was the great, unfulfilled young love of Draga Mašin, née Milićević Lunjevica, the tragic wife of Alexander I of Serbia. The great love was fettered by the sad fact that Bogdan apparently was not deemed a good enough match for Draga's family, which had close ties to the Obrenović court. To compound the tragedy, Draga was killed in 1903 coup d'état which toppled the Obrenović dynasty, in large part because of the royal marriage, considered inappropriate at the time, while Bogdan lived out the remainder of his life as a bachelor.

Popović lived long enough to see the liberation of Belgrade in 1944, though the fall of Nazi Germany came as a blessing, the rise of Yugoslav communism was a total shock. He died in his hometown of Belgrade on 7 November 1944.

General Estimate

Long disregarded, Bogdan Popović's criticism has of late attracted increasing attention. With formal education, tutored systematically about reading and writing by the best authors, Popović was better equipped than any other Serbian literary critic, probably in quantity, quite certainly in quality. His emphasis upon form was French. He delighted in the well-constructed essay, adhering closely to a plan, and leaving no loose ends. His criticism still is important because he made use of principles in judging a work. He developed a Leibnitzian conception of the oneness of the universe, and he may have tried to make art fit into this scheme.

His judgements of Serbian contemporaries and his admiration for the French language and literature are important factors to note. And even more are his contributions to critical theory. Though moderated with advancing years, his demand was for new literature springing from Serbia, for a style growing from within rather than imposed from without ('the Belgrade style'). Power he regarded as more important than form. Truly great poetry he believed must spring from a great national spirit.

Quiet, dignified, reserved, Popović was a professor and a person of great repute. He collaborated with his brother Pavle Popović, Jovan Skerlić, Branko Lazarević, Slobodan Jovanović and foreign literary scholars, like Canadian Watson Kirkconnell, introducing modern Serbian literature to the world. He was a man of pronounced civil decency, without any exclusive attributes, committed to the hierarchy of civil society values, an absolute enthusiast for France, which was his model in values and culture.

Bogdan Popović was a man of great learning and analytical consistency. His approach was to examine the internal working of the text, what makes art a special category of human experience and a creative expression. He had a deep and sincere belief in the influence of literature on the soul and mind as a source of inspiration. For him, this was the realm where language was able to reveal not empirical truths but symbolic ones that might point to greater understanding of the human condition. In his teaching and writing he tried to develop there qualities in his students and the reading public, to raise their aesthetic awareness. In the twentieth century Popović's legacy has reasserted itself on occasions as a contrast to the Yugoslav communists' utilitarian approaches towards culture and the purpose of art in society. Perhaps for these reasons he was left ignored and forgotten until 1981.

Selected works

 Bomarše, Biography, 1925
 Članci i predavanja o književnosti, umetnosti, jeziku i moralu, Essays and Articles, 1932
 Antologija novije srpske lirike, 1911

Legacy
He is included in The 100 most prominent Serbs.

References

Adapted from the Serbian Wikipedia.

Jovan Skerlić, Istorija nove srpske književnosti / A History of Modern Serbian Literature (Belgrade, 1921) pages 479-482

External links 
 Biography on the website of SANU

Academic staff of the University of Belgrade
Members of the Serbian Academy of Sciences and Arts
Serbian literary critics
Literary critics of Serbian
1863 births
1944 deaths